Nukabad (also Romanized as Nūkābād) is a village in Kambel-e Soleyman Rural District, in the Central District of Chabahar County, Sistan and Baluchestan Province, Iran. At the 2006 census, its population was 628, in 135 families.

References 

Populated places in Chabahar County